UK Ching (1937 - 25 July 2014) was a Bangladeshi freedom fighter, who was awarded the Bir Bikram in 1971 for his military services in the Bangladesh Liberation War. Ching was born in 1937 into poverty in a Marma family of Chittagong Hill Tracts (now in Bangladesh) of British India. At the age of 15, Ching joined the East Pakistan Rifles, better known as the Bangladesh Rifles during the modern age. He served Mukti Bahini in the Bangladesh liberation war and remained an active member of the Bangladesh Rifles until 1982.

Personal life
Ching is survived by his wife, two sons and two daughters. He died on 25 July 2014, of a stroke.

References

1937 births
2014 deaths
People of the Bangladesh Liberation War
Mukti Bahini personnel
Marma people
Bangladeshi Buddhists